The North Fork Tuolumne River is a  long river in the central Sierra Nevada of Tuolumne County, California and is a major tributary of the Tuolumne River. From there it flows generally southwest, past Long Barn, Twaine Harte, Soulsbyville and Tuolumne.

Like the Clavey River, which flows about parallel to the North Fork several miles to the east and also drains into the Tuolumne River, the North Fork is one of only a few Sierra foothill streams that are undisturbed by major dams or diversions. However, the Turlock Irrigation District has sought at times to dam the North Fork and the Clavey for hydropower generation.

The lower  of the North Fork is a class V whitewater run from Riverside Campground to the Tuolumne River. Due to the small watershed of the river, it is typically only boatable after heavy rain.

See also
List of rivers of California

References

Rivers of Tuolumne County, California